Carole Lucarelli (born 26 November 1972) is a French former professional tennis player.

Lucarelli played on the professional tour in the 1990s and reached a career high ranking of 175 in the world. She twice featured in the women's singles main draw at the French Open, as a wildcard in 1993 and 1994.

ITF finals

Singles: 5 (3–2)

References

External links
 
 

1972 births
Living people
French female tennis players
Mediterranean Games medalists in tennis
Mediterranean Games silver medalists for France
Competitors at the 1993 Mediterranean Games